Jovana Marjanović (Serbian Cyrillic: Јована Марјановић) (born c. 1987 in Novi Sad, Yugoslavia) represented her country (which was then Serbia and Montenegro) in the Miss Earth 2005 pageant, held in Quezon City, Philippines on 23 October 2005, where she was crowned Miss Earth-Fire (3rd runner-up).

References

External links
- Jovana Marjanovic Miss Vatre

Miss Earth 2005 contestants
Serbian beauty pageant winners
Serbian female models
Living people
1980s births
Models from Novi Sad